Henry Lewis Morrison (born February 11, 1948) is a Canadian former professional ice hockey player who played 564 National Hockey League (NHL) games for the Philadelphia Flyers, Atlanta Flames, Washington Capitals and Pittsburgh Penguins between 1969 and 1978. Morrison played junior with the Flin Flon Bombers of the Western Canada Hockey League, and was selected by the Flyers 8th overall in the 1968 NHL Amateur Draft. He made his professional debut that year with the Flyers' American Hockey League affiliate, the Quebec Aces, and joined Philadelphia for the 1969–70 season. After three seasons with the Flyers Morrison was claimed by the expansion Atlanta Flames in 1972, and played two seasons there before joining another expansion team, the Washington Capitals. He briefly played for Washington before being traded to the Pittsburgh Penguins, where he would play the last four years of his career.

Morrison was born in Gainsborough, Saskatchewan and raised in Hartney, Manitoba.

Career statistics

Regular season and playoffs

External links
 

1948 births
Living people
Atlanta Flames players
Binghamton Dusters players
Canadian ice hockey right wingers
Canadian people of Scottish descent
Flin Flon Bombers players
Ice hockey people from Manitoba
Ice hockey people from Saskatchewan
National Hockey League first-round draft picks
Philadelphia Flyers draft picks
Philadelphia Flyers players
Pittsburgh Penguins players
Quebec Aces (AHL) players
Richmond Robins players
Washington Capitals players